Evdokia is one of the most important works of Greek cinema. It is a drama of passion whose main characters are a sergeant and a prostitute (Evdokia) who get married after a brief passionate affair. Very soon, however, the influence of their environment strains their relationship, and the man tries to break away, but without success. The pair is surrounded by harsh light, rock, bare landscapes and military exercises, on the one hand, and sensuality and constrictions, on the other. Because of her occupation, Evdokia both attracts and repels the sergeant. The petit bourgeois environment, the lumpen elements, the social fringes and petty interests stifle the young couple: they apparently want to rebel, but never succeed.

With everything moving among violent sensuality, cruelty, coarseness, and total austerity, this "prosaic" story assumes the dimensions of an ancient tragedy. The inner struggle of the protagonists, the conflict of desires and values, the straightforward narration, vigorous pace, immediacy and sound construction constitute one of the most important works of the Greek cinema. In Greece, the film is mostly known for the popular Zeibekiko instrumental piece "Zeibekiko of Evdokia", written by Manos Loizos. In 1986, Evdokia was voted by the Greek Film Critics Association as the best Greek film of all time.

Cast
Maria Vassiliou ..... Evdokia
Giorgos Koutouzis ..... Giorgos Paschos
Koula Agagiotou ..... Maria Koutroubi
Christos Zorbas ..... Giorgos

References

Alexis Damianos: The Lyricism of Violence

External links 
 

1971 films
1971 drama films
Films set in Greece
Films shot in Athens
1970s Greek-language films
Greek drama films